Slightly Honorable is a 1939 American film directed by Tay Garnett. The film was based on the 1939 novel Send Another Coffin by Frank Gilmore Presnell, Jr. (1906–1967).

Cast 
Pat O'Brien as John Webb
Edward Arnold as Vincent Cushing
Broderick Crawford as Russ Sampson
Ruth Terry as Ann Seymour
Alan Dinehart as District Attorney Joyce
Claire Dodd as Alma Brehmer
Phyllis Brooks as Sarilla Cushing
Eve Arden as Miss Ater
Douglass Dumbrille as George Taylor
Bernard Nedell as Pete Godena
Douglas Fowley as Madder
Ernest Truex as P. Hemingway Collins
Janet Beecher as Mrs. Cushing
Evelyn Keyes as Miss Vlissingen
John Sheehan as Mike Daley
Addison Richards as Inspector Fromm
Cliff Clark as Captain Graves

Reception
The film recorded a loss of $107,709.

Home video
Because HBO via Masterpiece Productions' successor, Time-Life Films never owned complete rights to this film, other companies (public domain video distributors) have been able to release home video versions of Slightly Honorable for the past decades, with the quality of the prints used varying by distributor. On April 17, 2012, Mill Creek Entertainment released the film on DVD as part of their Dark Crimes: 50 Movie Set DVD box set.

References

External links 

1939 films
American mystery films
1930s English-language films
American black-and-white films
Films based on American novels
Films directed by Tay Garnett
United Artists films
Films produced by Walter Wanger
1939 mystery films
Films scored by Werner Janssen
1930s American films